Don Valley may refer to:

Australia 
 Don Valley, Victoria, a suburb of Melbourne, Australia

Canada 
 Don Valley, the valley associated with the Don River (Ontario)
 Don Valley Parkway, a freeway
 Don Valley (electoral district), a federal electoral district represented in the Canadian House of Commons from 1968 to 1979

England 
Things associated with the valley of the River Don in Yorkshire:
 Don Valley Festival, the annual music and drama festival that takes place within the Don Valley area
 Don Valley (UK Parliament constituency), Doncaster
 Lower Don Valley, a mainly industrial area of Sheffield
 Don Valley Stadium, an athletics stadium in Sheffield

See also
Don River (disambiguation)